Maria Vladimirovna Khoreva (born 3 July 2000  ) is a Russian ballet dancer and first soloist of the Mariinsky Ballet since 2018.

Early life 
Khoreva was born on 3 July 2000 in Saint Petersburg, Russia. Before being accepted to the Vaganova Ballet Academy, Khoreva practiced rhythmic gymnastics for seven years.

While at the Vaganova Academy, Khoreva was taught by celebrated professor Lyudmila Kovaleva, who is known for producing such talents as Diana Vishneva and Olga Smirnova. Khoreva was one of only a handful of students in her year to graduate with an honors diploma. In her final year of study, Khoreva performed the following roles with the Academy both domestically and internationally:

Dance of the Hours: Night
Suite en Blanc: Flute, Adagio
Le Réveil de Flore: Flora, Aurora
The Fairy Doll: Fairy Doll
The Nutcracker: Masha

The Mariinsky

Khoreva joined the Mariinsky Ballet in 2018 after graduating from the Vaganova Academy. In the summer before the start of her first season with the company, she debuted as Terpsichore in George Balanchine's Apollo alongside former Mariinsky principal Xander Parish in the title role.

In the fall of 2018, Khoreva debuted in Le Corsaire as one of the trio of Odalisques and as one of the Prince's friends in the Swan Lake pas de trois. In October, she danced the title role in Paquita, a rarity for such a recent graduate, and at the end of the month was promoted from the corps de ballet to first soloist, a rank just one step below principal dancer.

Her repertoire with the Mariinsky thus far includes:

Don Quixote: Kitri, Queen of the Dryads
Giselle: Giselle
La Bayadère: Nikiya
Legend of Love: Shyrin
The Nutcracker: Masha
Paquita: Paquita
Raymonda: Raymonda
Sleeping Beauty: Princess Aurora, Princess Florine
Apollo: Terpsichore
Jewels: Diamonds
A Midsummer Night's Dream: Titania (Pas de deux from Act II)
Serenade: Soloist
Le Corsaire: Medora, Trio of Odalisques
Swan Lake: Friends of the Prince

Khoreva is coached by former Mariinsky soloist Elvira Tarasova.

Public life
Khoreva is widely known on Instagram under the handle @marachok. She documents her day-to-day life as a dancer on the account in both English and Russian, initially at the Vaganova Academy and now at the Mariinsky, and over the years has amassed over 500,000 followers. She is a spokesperson for the sportswear brand Nike, Inc. and an ambassador for Bloch dancewear.

Beginning in November 2020, Khoreva appeared on the third season of the Russian ballet competition television show Большой балет (Grand Ballet) aired on Russia-K. While he did not compete, she was partnered by Mariinsky principal dancer Vladimir Shklyarov for the show. During the third week of competition, Khoreva received the show's first ever perfect score for her performance of a variation from Paquita. She later won the competition overall in December.

Khoreva published a book titled Teach Me Ballet: How to Educate Your Body in December 2020.

External links

References 

2000 births
Living people
Russian ballerinas
Mariinsky Ballet first soloists
21st-century Russian ballet dancers